The 2018–19 Biathlon World Cup – Stage 2 was the second event of the season and was held in Hochfilzen, Austria, from 13 to 16 December 2018.

Schedule of events 
The events took place at the following times.

Medal winners

Men

Women

References 

2018–19 Biathlon World Cup
2018 in Austrian sport
Biathlon World Cup - Stage 2
Biathlon competitions in Austria